Shoot This is the second studio album by Australian post-grunge band Motor Ace, released in August 2002. The album gained more commercial success than their first album, debuting at number 1 on the ARIA Albums Chart and reached No. 40 in New Zealand.

Background 

Shoot This was recorded by Australian post-grunge and alternative rock band Motor Ace with  Chris Sheldon producing for Festival Mushroom Records' imprint Sputnik Records, which was issued in August 2002. The group had formed in Melbourne in 1998 and by early the following year the line-up had stabilised with Matt Balfe on bass guitar, Damian Costin on drums, Dave Ong on lead guitar and "Patch" Robertson on lead vocals and guitar. Shoot This, their second studio album, was preceded by two singles "Carry On" in May and "Keeping Secrets" in early August. Both reached the top 30 on the ARIA singles chart. The album debuted at No. 1 and was accredited a gold record for shipment of 35,000 copies by Australian Recording Industry Association (ARIA). On the Official New Zealand Music Chart it peaked at No. 40.

Track listing 

All tracks are written by Damian Birchall Costin, Patrick Thomas Robertson, David Ghim Cheng Ong and Matt Charles Balfe.

 "Carry On" – 4:55
 "Opportunity" – 4:06
 "Pieces" – 4:07
 "Feathers" – 4:10
 "Keeping Secrets" – 4:36
 "Ride the Wave" – 4:03
 "Shoot This" – 4:44
 "For Yourself" – 4:16
 "Where Did You Go?" – 4:17
 "When the Day Falls" – 3:31
 "When the Feeling's Gone" – 6:44

Personnel 

Motor Ace
 Matt Balfe – bass guitar, Hammond organ, backing vocals
 Damian Costin – drums, percussion
 Dave Ong – guitars, piano, backing vocals
 "Patch" Robertson – guitar, piano, lead vocal

Additional musicians
 John Barrett – horn
 Ian Bell – horn
 Chris Sheldon – backing vocals

Artisans
 Chris Blair – mastering
 David Chapman – string arrangements
 David Coulthard Clark – assistant
 Iva Davies – string arrangements
 David Davis – mixing assistant
 Chris Dickie – engineer
 Chris Sheldon – mixing, producer

Charts

Weekly charts

Year-end charts

Certifications

See also
 List of number-one albums of 2002 (Australia)

References

External links 
 

2002 albums
Motor Ace albums
Albums produced by Chris Sheldon